Phyllactis is a genus of cnidarians belonging to the family Actiniidae.

The species of this genus are found in America.

Species:

Phyllactis cichoracea 
Phyllactis conquilega 
Phyllactis formosa 
Phyllactis plicata
Phyllactis praetexta

References

Actiniidae
Hexacorallia genera